The Bremer 25 is an American trailerable sailboat that was designed by Mark Bremer as a racer-cruiser and first built in 1995.

Production
The design was built by CW Hood Yachts for Bremer Marine in the United States starting in 1995, but it is now out of production.

Design
The designer was a business consultant with an MBA, who wanted to design a production sailboat.

The Bremer 25 is a recreational keelboat, built predominantly of fiberglass. The hull and the deck are made from vacuum-bagged biaxal fiberglass with a Core-Cell foam core. It has a fractional sloop rig, a plumb stem, a vertical transom, a transom-hung rudder controlled by a tiller and a lifting keel. It displaces  and carries  of lead ballast in a swept bulb on the fiberglass keel.

The boat is normally fitted with a small  outboard motor for docking and maneuvering.

The design has sleeping accommodation for four people, with a small double "V"-berth in the bow cabin and an aft cabin with a large double berth. The galley is located on the port side just aft of the bow cabin. The galley is equipped with a stove and a sink. The main cabin has two small seats. The stand-up head is located just aft of the bow cabin on the starboard side.

Operational history
In a 2002 review Quentin Warren wrote in Cruising World, "the Bremer favors the performance end of the pocket cruiser spectrum". In describing sailing it, he wrote, "true to form, the Bremer accelerated well, tracked like a monorail and stood up to any puffs. Response at the helm was instant and refined; reaction to subtle trim, noticeable and attentive. The jib on this boat features roller furling with the unit recessed into the bow, and this keeps the airflow attached down low on what is truly a deck-sweeper of a headsail. A deck-fitted sprit can be deployed from the cockpit by yanking on a clever tackle arrangement; off the breeze we launched an asymmetrical kite from the end of this and charged along in good control."

In a 2010 review Steve Henkel wrote, "...how many 25-foot sleek-looking sport boats do you see with six-foot headroom? Or a double berth big enough to accommodate two full-sized adults? Or an enclosed stand-up head? Or a very deep keel with ballast of 1,600 pounds (42% B/D ratio) massed almost at its bottom? Best features: This boat has enough freeboard to make the cabin quite roomy. With her retractable keel, she shouldn't be too hard to launch and retrieve at a trailer ramp. And her trailer towing weight of just over 5,000 pounds is low enough to permit use of a variety of 20- to 30-year-old full-size cars equipped with towing packages to pull her over the road. Worst features: The forward berth would only be useful for two very small children or one small adult."

See also
List of sailing boat types

References

Keelboats
1990s sailboat type designs
Sailing yachts
Trailer sailers
Sailboat types built by CW Hood Yachts
Sailboat type designs by Mark Bremer